Sequence Hills is an escarpment-like hills on the west margin of the upper Rennick Glacier, about 7 nautical miles (13 km) northwest of Caudal Hills, Victoria Land. They provided the only good geological sequence in the area. Mapped and named by the northern party of New Zealand Geological Survey Antarctic Expedition (NZGSAE), 1962–63.

See also
Barren Bluff
Waring Bluff

Hills of Victoria Land
Pennell Coast